Max Karl Werner Wien (25 December 1866 – 22 February 1938) was a German physicist and the director of the Institute of Physics at the University of Jena.  He was born in Königsberg, Prussia (now Kaliningrad, Russia), the son of the co-owner of the well-known Castell grain company, Otto Wien. He was a cousin of Nobel laureate Wilhelm Wien.

Wien studied in Konigsberg, Freiburg, and Berlin under Hermann von Helmholtz and August Kundt, receiving his PhD under Helmholtz in 1888.  In 1892 he worked with Wilhelm Röntgen in Würzburg, where in 1893 he received the habilitation, qualifying him to be a professor.  He moved to the Technical High School of Aachen in 1898 where he became Extraordinary Professor in 1899.  In 1904 he became full Professor at the Technical High School of Danzig (now Gdańsk, Poland).  From 1911 to 1935 he was Professor at University of Jena, in Jena, Germany, where he died in 1938.

Wien's scientific research were in the areas of high frequency electronics, acoustics, and electrolyte conductance.  He is known for the invention of the Wien bridge in 1891, a type of AC measurement circuit similar to the Wheatstone bridge which was used to measure the impedance of capacitors and inductors.  From 1906 to 1909 he did research into the efficiency of early radio transmitters, called spark gap transmitters, which used an electric spark to generate radio waves.  In existing transmitters the spark damped the oscillation in the tuned circuit, creating highly damped waves, in which the radio energy was spread over a wide bandwidth, limiting their range.   In 1906 Wien invented a new type of spark gap, called a "quenched gap", that extinguished the spark immediately after energy had been transferred to the tuned circuit.  This transmitter produced very lightly damped waves, which had a narrower bandwidth and thus greater range, and also produced an easy to identify musical tone in the receiver headphones.  Wien "singing spark" or quenched-spark transmitters ("Löschfunkensender") were widely used until the end of the spark era around 1920.  At Jena he studied the conductance of electrolyte solutions when high fields and high frequencies, discovering what is now called Wien's law.

The Wien bridge oscillator is so named because it uses a Wien bridge as a feedback network, but it was not invented by Wien.  William Hewlett, co-founder of Hewlett-Packard, was the first to use a Wien bridge as a feedback network around a vacuum tube amplifier to create an oscillator in 1939.

References 

1866 births
1938 deaths
20th-century German physicists
Scientists from Königsberg
People from the Province of Prussia
Academic staff of the University of Jena
19th-century German inventors
19th-century German physicists